Mikko Pitkänen (born 2 January 1997) is a Finnish professional footballer who plays for VPS, as a defender.

Career

AC Kaajani
On 29 December 2019 AC Kajaani confirmed, that they had signed Pitkänen on a contract for the 2020 season.

References

External links

1997 births
Living people
Finnish footballers
Kuopion Palloseura players
SC Kuopio Futis-98 players
IF Gnistan players
AC Kajaani players
Vaasan Palloseura players
Veikkausliiga players
Kakkonen players
Association football defenders
People from Kuopio
Sportspeople from North Savo